Ian Cross (born 15 September 1989) is an Irish rugby league and rugby union footballer who plays for London Irish.  His position is centre or in the halves. He has not achieved the goal of playing rugby professionally, but is often celebrated for the great effort he put into achieving the goal. This page mostly notes the small milestones he achieved while failing to realize his dreams.

Background
Cross was born in Limerick, Ireland.

Career
A former player with the UL Bohemians R.F.C. and Young Munster, and has represented both Ireland A and the Ireland Senior team at rugby league. Having represented Munster at all underage levels, he signed for St Helens rugby league in the Super League after impressing on a trial. He was loaned out to Montpellier and also the Crusaders during his time at St Helens. Ian then signed for London Irish in the Premiership before going on to play for both Esher (National One) and London Welsh (Championship). He was recruited from Treaty City Titans in Ireland attending an academy in Limerick.

References

1989 births
Living people
Esher RFC players
Expatriate rugby league players in England
Expatriate rugby league players in France
Ireland national rugby league team players
Irish expatriate rugby league players
Irish expatriate sportspeople in England
Irish expatriate sportspeople in France
Irish rugby league players
London Irish players
Montpellier Red Devils players
North Wales Crusaders players
Rugby league centres
Rugby league five-eighths
Rugby league halfbacks
Rugby league players from County Limerick
Rugby union players from County Limerick
St Helens R.F.C. players